Psammodius basalis is a species of aphodiine dung beetle in the family Scarabaeidae. It is found in Europe and Northern Asia (excluding China) and North America.

References

Further reading

 Arnett, R. H. Jr., M. C. Thomas, P. E. Skelley and J. H. Frank. (eds.). (21 June 2002). American Beetles, Volume II: Polyphaga: Scarabaeoidea through Curculionoidea. CRC Press LLC, Boca Raton, Florida .
 
 Richard E. White. (1983). Peterson Field Guides: Beetles. Houghton Mifflin Company.

Scarabaeidae
Beetles described in 1870